Nicolae Selymes (born 11 March 1940) is a Romanian former footballer who played as a forward. He is the uncle of Tibor Selymes who was also an international footballer.

International career
Nicolae Selymes played one game for Romania's national team when coach Silviu Ploeșteanu used him in a 1–3 loss against Morocco, sending him in the 70th minute of the game in order to replace Nicolae Tătaru.

Honours
Dinamo București
Divizia A: 1962–63

References

1940 births
Living people
Romanian footballers
Romania international footballers
Romanian sportspeople of Hungarian descent
Association football forwards
Liga I players
Liga II players
FC Brașov (1936) players
FC Dinamo București players